Professor Donald Frederick Leach CBE (24 June 1931 – 25 February 2009), was a Scottish physicist and Liberal Party politician who later joined the Labour Party. He also served as the Principal and Vice Patron of Edinburgh’s Queen Margaret College (now Queen Margaret University) for 11 years from 1985 - 1996.

Background
Leach was born the son of Frederick John Mansell Leach and Annie Ivy Foster. He was educated at John Ruskin Grammar School, Croydon Polytechnic, Norwood Technical College and Dundee College of Technology. In 1952 he married June Valentine Reid. They had two sons and one daughter. He was appointed a CBE in 1996.

Professional career
Leach was Visiting lecturer in mathematics at Dundee Technical College. He was Head of Department of Mathematics, Napier College of Science and Technology, and Principal and Vice Patron of Queen Margaret College.

Political career
Leach was an Executive member of the Scottish Liberal Party. He was Liberal candidate for the Edinburgh West division at the 1959 General Election. He was Liberal candidate for the East Fife division at the 1961 by-election. In 1964 he left the Liberals and joined the Labour Party. He was Labour candidate for the Kinross and West Perthshire division at the 1970 General Election. He did not stand for parliament again.

Electoral record

References

1931 births
2009 deaths
Liberal Party (UK) parliamentary candidates
Labour Party (UK) parliamentary candidates
Alumni of Croydon College